Kanyapur Polytechnic is a technical school located in the city of Asansol, Paschim Bardhaman district, West Bengal, India. It is affiliated with the West Bengal State Council of Technical Education (WBSCTE), and approved by the All India Council For Technical Education (AICTE). It provides diploma-level technical education to its students.

The foundation stone of this institute was laid in the year 1962 by the industrialist Late Shri Sudhir Kumar Sen in the outskirts of Asansol. Shri Sudhir Kumar Sen was also the founder of the cycle manufacturing factory popularly known as Raleigh Cycle. Later with the aim of imparting education among the children of this locality, Shri Sen established Kanyapur Education Society under the umbrella of which a technical education institute was established on 16 July 1965 named as Sudhir Sen Polytechnic. At that time a three-year diploma course of Mechanical Engineering and Electrical Engineering was stated. After a few years this institute offered a four-year Licensing course in Mechanical Engineering (LME) and Electrical Engineering (LEE).

Thirteen years after its inception this polytechnic was taken over by Government of West Bengal on 17 May 1979. Since then this technical institute's name has been Kanyapur Polytechnic. Honourable Shri B. Bari was the first principal of the polytechnic after the government takeover. A diploma course in Computer Science & Technology was started in 2007. At present this polytechnic offers a three-year diploma course in Mechanical Engineering (DME), Electrical Engineering (DEE) and Computer Science & Technology (DCST).

Departments
It was established in 1962 and offers admission to three branches:
 Mechanical Engineering 
 Electrical Engineering
 Computer Science and Engineering

Admission procedure
Admission in the first year (regular entry) and second year (lateral entry) to the diploma courses are based on the merit list of JEXPO and VOCLET exam respectively conducted by West Bengal State Council of Technical Education.

Location
The nearest airport is at Durgapur about one hours' drive through NH2. Asansol is well connected through rail and road with the rest of India.

Library 
In college, there is a library. The students can issue trade wise textbooks for a certain period of time. The library has also plenty of seating capacity for studying inside. Most of the textbooks of all departments are available in the library. The library is really very helpful for needy students. Every student can issue two textbooks for every semester and can read any books inside the library. The library also provides access to different magazines and newspapers.

Centers
In the College building language room, common room and seminar hall, and indoor games room is also available.

Cells
1.Training and Placement Cell
2.Anti-Ragging Cell

Campus
In a single premise, there are four major structures.
1. Main Building
2. New Building
3. Workshops
4. Boys' Hostel
An outdoor sports area is present inside campus.

Workshops
On the campus following workshop are available for students' practical training.
Machine Shop
Carpentry Shop
Welding Shop
Fitting Shop
Forging Shop
Electrical Workshop
Electronic Workshop

Labs
On the campus following workshop are available for students'.
Physics Laboratory
Chemistry Laboratory
Computer Laboratory

Images

See also
List of institutions of higher education in West Bengal
Education in India
Education in West Bengal

References

Cultural Committee
Having a Cultural Committee responsible for various extracurricular activities like Fresher's Welcome, Annual Sports, Annual Cultural Programme etc.

External links 
 http://kanyapoly.net/

Universities and colleges in Paschim Bardhaman district
Bardhaman
1962 establishments in West Bengal
Technical universities and colleges in West Bengal
Educational institutions established in 1962